Raymond Alan Tumbridge (born 6 March 1955 in Hampstead) is an English former professional footballer who played in the Football League, as a defender.

References

Sources

1955 births
Living people
English footballers
Association football defenders
Footballers from Hampstead
Charlton Athletic F.C. players
Folkestone F.C. players
Northampton Town F.C. players
Weymouth F.C. players
Dartford F.C. players
Ebbsfleet United F.C. players
Margate F.C. players
Tonbridge Angels F.C. players
National League (English football) players
English Football League players